LaVonne A. Pietsch (née Idso; January 31, 1936) is an American politician. She served as a Republican member for the 22nd district in the North Dakota House of Representatives from 2002 to 2012. She was married to Bill Pietsch, who served in the House from 2000 to 2002.

References

1936 births
Living people
People from Cass County, North Dakota
Women state legislators in North Dakota
Republican Party members of the North Dakota House of Representatives
21st-century American politicians
21st-century American women politicians